Eupithecia tenuiscripta  is a moth in the family Geometridae. It is found in New Guinea.

The wingspan is about 19 mm. The forewings are brownish fuscous tinged with greenish. The hindwings are pale grey, with traces of darker grey curved lines.

References

Moths described in 1907
tenuiscripta
Moths of Asia